Mikael Holm (born 8 October 1968) is a Swedish luger. He competed at the 1988, 1992, 1994 and the 1998 Winter Olympics.

References

External links
 

1968 births
Living people
Swedish male lugers
Olympic lugers of Sweden
Lugers at the 1988 Winter Olympics
Lugers at the 1992 Winter Olympics
Lugers at the 1994 Winter Olympics
Lugers at the 1998 Winter Olympics
Sportspeople from Stockholm